Serge Bezème (born October 7, 1977 in Abidjan) is an Ivorian professional footballer who currently plays in the Championnat de France amateur for ES Viry-Châtillon.

He played a total of 3 matches at the professional level in Liga de Honra for Portimonense S.C.

References

External links
 

1977 births
Living people
Ivorian footballers
Ivorian expatriate footballers
Expatriate footballers in France
Expatriate footballers in Portugal
Entente SSG players
Portimonense S.C. players
US Boulogne players
Villemomble Sports players
ES Viry-Châtillon players
Footballers from Abidjan
FC Les Lilas players
Association football midfielders